Leopold Guy Francis Maynard Greville, 6th Earl of Warwick, CMG MVO (10 September 1882 – 31 January 1928), styled Lord Brooke between 1893 and 1924, was a British officer.

Early life
Greville was the son of Francis Greville, 5th Earl of Warwick and his wife, the former Daisy Maynard.

He was educated at Eton, he eventually ran away from the school, supposedly selling his fur coat and gun to travel to join the Second Boer War.

He succeeded his father in the earldom in January 1924.

Military service
Lord Brooke was a second lieutenant in the 7th (Militia) Battalion of The King's Royal Rifle Corps, and was seconded for service with a line battalion in March 1900. He fought in the Second Boer War (1899–1901), and was promoted to 2nd Lieutenant in the Life Guards on 3 November 1900. From August 1901 he served as Aide-de-Camp to Lord Milner, High Commissioner for South Africa, an appointment he held until the conclusion of the war in 1902. He was also a Reuters correspondent during the Russo-Japanese War (1904–1905). In 1907 he was Aide-de-Camp to the Inspector-General of the Forces. In 1905 he was appointed a Member of the Royal Victorian Order (MVO).

During the First World War he was Aide-de-Camp to the General Officer Commanding of the British Expeditionary Force from 1914 until 1915. He was then promoted to Brigadier General later that year and commanded 4th Canadian Infantry Brigade and then 12th Canadian Infantry Brigade until wounded on 12 September 1916. After recovering, he served in Paris with the Canadian Mission.

Letters and passports indicate that Leopold was present in Russia during 1917 and probably witnessed the beginnings of the Russian Revolution. There are no comprehensive records as to the reasons for his visit, however, which sparked rumors that he may have been a spy for the Russian or the British royal families.

Death

Much speculation and rumour surrounds the demise of Leopold and his premature death in 1928. It has been suggested that Leopold suffered from shell shock after his return from World War One, which was later fueled by severe alcoholism. In his final years he moved out of Warwick Castle to live with a mistress in Mill Street, Warwick. He eventually died in Brighton, where he was being treated for his illness.

Personal life

On 29 April 1909, Lord Warwick married Elfrida Marjorie Eden (1887–1943).  She was the only daughter of Sir William Eden, 7th Baronet and Sybil Frances Grey (a daughter Sir William Grey KCSI by his second wife).  Together, Lord Warwick and Elfrida were the parents of three children:

 Charles Guy Fulke Greville, 7th Earl of Warwick (1911–1984).
 Richard Francis Maynard Greville (1913–1968), who served as a Governor of University College Hospital from 1952 to 1968.
 John Ambrose Henry Greville (1918–1942), who was killed in action.

After his death, his widow, the Countess of Warwick served as Mayor of Warwick in 1929, 1930 and 1931 before her death on 10 February 1943.

Selected works
  An Eye-witness in Manchuria (1905).'' London: E. Nash.

References

External links

1882 births
1928 deaths
People educated at Eton College
Earls in the Peerage of Great Britain
People of the Russo-Japanese War
British Life Guards officers
British Army personnel of the Second Boer War
Companions of the Order of St Michael and St George
Members of the Royal Victorian Order
Leopold
6